Digermulen is a village in Vågan Municipality in Nordland county, Norway.  It is located on the southwestern tip of the large island of Hinnøya.  It is the main village of eastern Vågan since that part of the municipality is not directly connected to the rest of the municipality (most of Vågan is on Austvågøya island).  There is a long roundabout road connection through neighboring Hadsel Municipality to get to the rest of Vågan, and there is a ferry connection to the nearby island of Stormolla.  Digermulen Church is located in this village.

References

Villages in Nordland
Vågan
Populated places of Arctic Norway